Quack Shot is a 1954 American animated comedy short film directed by Robert McKimson. The cartoon was released on October 30, 1954 as part of the Merrie Melodies series, and stars Daffy Duck and Elmer Fudd.

Plot
Elmer Fudd is duck hunting at a lake when he shoots a young duckling which falls into his boat. As Elmer examines it, Daffy Duck pops out of the water and grabs the duckling from Elmer.  Daffy then bandages the duckling and places it into the lake. Daffy then warns Elmer "If you shoot one more duck, just one more duck, you will be in trouble!!" Elmer then proceeds to shoot Daffy at point-blank range, which removes Daffy's scalp,  and again as he jumps back in the lake, removing his tail feathers. Daffy decides that it is time to declare war.

Daffy then uses various tricks to prevent Elmer's repeated attempts at hunting. Usually, these tricks end up backfiring on Daffy, with one exception when Daffy launches a miniature toy battleship at Elmer's boat, its real guns shoot Elmer in the face after he retrieves the boat from the water. After Daffy tries to pull a few more pranks, Elmer ties him up with rope and sends him out into the lake on a boat filled with explosives. The boat heads out into the lake but then circles back toward the pier where Elmer is standing. As the boat returns toward the pier, Daffy manages to jump into the lake. The boat then explodes at the precise moment that it returns to the pier where Elmer is standing.

Elmer, wrapped in bandages, decides that he is going to try fishing instead. After he catches a miniature red-striped barracuda, a larger barracuda emerges from the lake, releases the smaller fish, and threatens Elmer against catching any more fish. Daffy then emerges from underneath Elmer's hat and utters the words "strong union" before happily hopping away on the water.

References

1954 films
1954 animated films
1954 short films
1950s Warner Bros. animated short films
Merrie Melodies short films
Daffy Duck films
Elmer Fudd films
Films directed by Robert McKimson
Films scored by Carl Stalling
1950s English-language films
Films about hunters
Films set on lakes